Australia B is a secondary soccer team occasionally as support for the Australia national soccer team. The team has only ever played nine matches; winning one, drawing six, and losing two. It has been inactive since 1985.

Concept and history
The national B team was designed to give games to players who were being considered for call-up to the full national squad. Generally, the team played in friendly matches against other international B teams or club sides.

Australia B were one of several teams which entered a "World Series" held in Australia in 1984, which included Rangers, Juventus, Australia A, Nottingham Forest and Iraklis. They were coached in the tournament by Eddie Thomson

In 1985, Australia B played two games against China in the leadup to the 1987 Ampol Cup between China and Australia. They were coached by John Margaritis in both games.

In 2007, then-Australia coach Graham Arnold, himself a former B international, flagged the idea of reviving the national B team.

Statistics

Results and fixtures

1984

1985

Historical statistics
 Highest attendance: 18,300 vs.  Iraklis at Melbourne.
 Heaviest defeat: 2–4 vs.  Rangers, 7 June 1984 at Adamstown Oval, Newcastle

Player records

Most appearances

Goalscorers

Managers
 Eddie Thomson 1984
 John Margaritis 1985

References

B
Asian national B association football teams